Alexander Smith (1829/30, probably 31 December 18295 January 1867) was a Scottish poet, labelled as one of the Spasmodic School, and essayist.

Life

Alexander Smith was the eldest of eight, possibly nine, children born to John Smith (1803–1884) and Christina née Murray (1804–1881).  John Smith was a pattern designer for the textile trade; he worked variously in Paisley and in Kilmarnock, where Alexander was born, before moving to Glasgow when Alexander was about eight years old.

When Alexander was still at school, he was stricken by a fever that left him with a squint in one eye.  Details of his schooling are sparse, but it is known that it began in Paisley and continued at a school in John Street in Glasgow.  There was talk of him being trained for the ministry, but the family's finances required that he leave school at the age of eleven and follow his father's trade in the muslin factory.

Alexander was an avid reader, and became co-founder, with like-minded youngsters, of the Glasgow Addisonian Literary Society.  Early poems were published in The Glasgow Citizen, whose proprietor and editor James Hedderwick became a patron and friend.  The success of his first volume of poems, A Life Drama and other Poems (1853), brought him fame and influential supporters that led to him being appointed Secretary of Edinburgh University in 1854.

In Edinburgh, Smith was a near neighbour of the landscape painter Horatio McCulloch, who had also grown up in Glasgow, and the two became firm friends.
McCulloch's wife, Marcella MacLellan, was from the Isle of Skye, where the Cuillin were the subjects of many of McCulloch's paintings.  He and Alexander Nicolson, a Skyeman living in Edinburgh, introduced Smith to the island.  That introduction had a profound effect on Smith's remaining years.

On 24 April 1857 Smith married Marcella's cousin, Flora Nicolson Macdonald (1829–1873), at Ord House, her parents' home on Sleat peninsula in Skye.  The couple returned to Skye every summer, and the island inspired the work for which Smith is most remembered today: A Summer in Skye.

Smith's later years brought financial worry.  His salary from the university had been increased to £200 per annum, but sales of his writing was damaged by hostile criticism.  He had to support a growing family, and maintain 'Gesto Villa', a large house in Wardie that had been bought for them an uncle of Flora who had made his fortune in India from Indigo.  Although Alexander's working hours at the university left time to write, that time was largely absorbed in entertaining his many friends and relatives.

He contracted diphtheria in November 1866.  That became compounded with typhoid fever.  By the end of the year he seemed to be rallying but the combination was too much.  He died at home on 5 January 1867 aged thirty-seven, and was buried five days later in Warriston Cemetery.

Memorial 
His 16 feet (4.87m) tall red sandstone cross stands close to the old East Gate (now sealed) of Warriston Cemetery (access is by another gate).

The memorial was designed by the artist James Drummond (1816–1877) in a Celtic cross design including a harp, poet's laurel bay leaf wreath, and a star, and the stonework was carved with thistles and bayleaves intertwining, by the sculptor John Rhind (1828–1892) and it also has a bronze head image of Smith in profile, added by William Brodie (1815 – 1881) who also sculpted Greyfriars Bobby.

The inscription is: "Alexander Smith, poet and essayist. Born at Kilmarnock, 31st Dec. 1829; Died at Wardie, 5th Jan. 1867." And at the base it has carved 'Erected by some of his personal friends'.

Works

As a poet he was one of the leading representatives of what was called the "Spasmodic" School, now fallen into oblivion. Smith, P. J. Bailey and Sydney Dobell were satirized by W. E. Aytoun in 1854 in Firmilian: a Spasmodic Tragedy.

In the year Sydney Dobell came to Edinburgh, an acquaintanceship sprang up between the two which resulted in their collaboration in a book of War Sonnets (1855), inspired by the Crimean War. Smith also published City Poems (1857) and Edwin of Deira (1861), a Northumbrian epic poem.

Although his early work A Life Drama was highly praised, his poetry was later less well thought of and was ridiculed as being a Spasmodic.  Edwin of Deira was also attacked, unjustly, as plagiarism.  Smith turned his attention to prose, and published Dreamthorp: Essays written in the Country (1863), noted especially for the essay A Lark's Flight, in which Smith describes the song of a lark breaking the silence just before the trapdoor is sprung under two condemned men.  Two years later he published his most celebrated work, A Summer in Skye (1865).  As well as these and many magazine articles, he edited the Golden Treasury edition of Burns, and wrote a novel, Alfred Hagart's Household, which was serialised in Good Words in 1865.

Smith's 1857 poem "Glasgow" was adapted into song in 2022 by Revival-Folk band :Bird in the Belly for their concept album :After the City.

Family

Alexander and Flora had five children:
Flora Macdonald (1858–1867)
Jessie Catherine (Murray) (1860–1941) went to Australia where she married James Morris
Charles Kenneth Macleod (1862–1890) died in Calcutta, India
Marcella MacLellan (1864–1865) (7 months)
Isabella Mary Macdonald (1866–1939) went to an uncle at Ord; she married Dr James Pender Smith.

With Alexander's death, Flora's life turned to tragedy.  Her mother had died the previous summer.  Now, in the space of three months and a few days, she lost her husband, her father, and her eldest child.  Only two months after that, McCulloch, who was probably the family's best friend in Edinburgh, died.  McCulloch's widow, Flora's cousin, left for Australia, and died on the voyage.  Flora, who had come from a beautiful and fairly isolated place, was left in a Victorian metropolis with three small children.  She died in 1873, aged forty-four; her death certificate gives the causes of death as cardiac disease, apoplexy, and alcoholism.

Quotations

"Stirling, like a huge brooch clasps Highlands and Lowlands together".
"In Scotland one is continually coming into contact with an unreasonable prejudice against English manners, institutions, and forms of thought; and in her expression of these prejudices Scotland is frequently neither great nor dignified. There is a narrowness and touchiness about her which is more frequently found in villages than in great cities. She continually suspects that the Englishman is about to touch her thistle rudely, or to take liberties with her unicorn."

Notes

References

Further reading
 Eyre-Todd, George, The Glasgow Poets / Their Lives and Poems, William Hodge & Co. (1903)

 Dictionary of Literary Biography: Alexander Smith,  Detroit: Gale, (1984)
 Victorian Poetry 42.4, Special issue on the Spasmodics, ed. Jason R. Rudy, West Virginia University Press (2004)
 Contemporary reviews of Smith's work can be found online by using Google Book Search.

External links

 
 
A Summer in Skye : full book available online.
 Essays by Alexander Smith at Quotidiana.org
  Oxford Dictionary of National Biography: Alexander Smith

1829 births
1867 deaths
Scottish male poets
19th-century Scottish poets
19th-century British male writers